The idea of veiled reality was championed by the French physicist-philosopher Bernard d'Espagnat. In his book of the same name, he coined the term veiled reality to explain why significant experiments over the preceding decades had failed to restore conventional realism. His ideas represented a different articulation of the matter and mind split that is basic to quantum theory. He asserted: "The doctrine that the world is made up of objects whose existence is independent of human consciousness turns out to be in conflict with quantum mechanics and with facts established by experiment."

This philosophical idea has been taken forward and named the principle of veiled nonlocality by Subhash Kak in his book The Nature of Physical Reality and in several articles where he claims that although reality is nonlocal this veiling affects not only expectations of experiments but also how the data is analyzed. This makes it possible to use this idea of veiling to explore limitations on cognitive processes.

Together with Menas Kafatos, he has also proposed that veiled nonlocality might be the explanation behind cosmic censorship.

References

Philosophy of physics